Deh Now-e Sadat-e Pain (also Romanized as Deh Now-e Sādāt-e Pā’īn; also known as Dehnow-e Sādāt-e Soflá) is a village in Rostam-e Do Rural District, in the Central District of Rostam County, Fars Province, Iran. At the 2006 census, its population was 579, in 123 families.

References 

Populated places in Rostam County